A ganglion cell is a cell found in a ganglion. Examples of ganglion cells include:
  Retinal ganglion cell (RGC) found in the ganglion cell layer of the retina
 Cells that reside in the adrenal medulla, where they are involved in the sympathetic nervous system's release of epinephrine and norepinephrine into the blood stream
 Cells of the sympathetic ganglia
 Cells of the parasympathetic ganglia
 Cells of the spiral ganglia

Neurons